Senator Wiener may refer to:

Deanna Wiener (born 1953), Minnesota State Senate
Scott Wiener (born 1970), California State Senate
Valerie Wiener (born 1948), Nevada State Senate